Daman-e-Koh is a viewing point and hill top garden north of Islamabad and located in the middle of the Margalla Hills. Its name is a conjunction of two Persian words, which together means foot hills. It is about 2400 ft from sea level and almost 500 ft from the city of Islamabad. It is a popular destination for the residents as well as the visitors to the capital.

Monkeys are a common sight, attracted by the food given by tourists. Leopards are frequently reported to descend from higher hills of Murree during snowfall.

Airblue Flight 202 crashed near here on 28 July 2010.

Access 
Daman-e-Koh is located on the road to Pir Sohawa, which is located at the top of Margalla Hills at an elevation of about 3600 ft. The popularity of the site regularly leads to traffic jams due to the absence of public transport options on the narrow, winding road. There were plans to construct a chairlift from Daman-e-Koh to Pir Sohawa, but were put on hold due to environmental concerns.  

The viewpoint can also be accessed by hiking on Trail 2.

Panoramic view of Islamabad 

The southern spot is the main attraction as it provides a panoramic view of Islamabad. The visitors experience a unique view of Faisal Mosque, the Seventh Avenue , and Rawal Lake.

Telescopes are installed for observers. There is also a large sign installed showing an original map of Islamabad.

Renovation 

In 2007, Capital Development Authority further developed the viewpoint by upgrading the restaurant, widening the car-parking and providing other necessary facilities including electric-powered cars.

References in literature
Daman-e-Koh is described in the book The Kite Runner by Khaled Hosseini.

Gallery

See also 
 Pir Sohawa
 Capital Development Authority
 Developments in Islamabad

References

External links 
Daman-e-Koh on TripAdvisor

Tourist attractions in Islamabad